Thomas McLeod may refer to:

 Thomas Gordon McLeod (1868–1932), governor of South Carolina
 Thomas McLeod (sailor) (1873–1960), Scottish sailor